École Secondaire Assomption is a Francophone high school in Rogersville, New Brunswick, Canada.

External links
 Assomption School Site

High schools in New Brunswick
Education in Northumberland County, New Brunswick